Jeppe Strokirk (16 June 1789 – 16 February 1856) was a Swedish ironmaster.

Life and work 

Jeppe Strokirk was born in Ölsboda on June 16, 1789. His parents were Elias and Anna Christina Strokirk (née Camitz).

Strokirk inherited the Ölsboda Works. In 1828, he erected the Ölsboda Manor, currently the only listed building in Degerfors Municipality.

In 1812, Elias Strokirk married Hedvig Magdalena Broms.

References

External links 

 Jeppe Strokirk at the National Archives of Sweden

1789 births
1856 deaths
Swedish landowners
Swedish ironmasters
Swedish nobility
Jeppe
Swedish people of German descent
People from Degerfors Municipality
19th-century Swedish businesspeople
Burials at Nysund Cemetery